Dieter Steinmann (born 2 April 1950) is a German sprinter. He competed in the men's 100 metres at the 1976 Summer Olympics representing West Germany.

References

External links
 

1950 births
Living people
Athletes (track and field) at the 1976 Summer Olympics
German male sprinters
Olympic athletes of West Germany
Place of birth missing (living people)
Universiade medalists in athletics (track and field)
Universiade bronze medalists for West Germany